Sveti Marko (Serbo-Croatian, Slovenian and Macedonian for "Saint Mark") may refer to:

Sveti Marko Island, an island in Montenegro
Selo Sveti Marko, a village in Croatia
Ostenk, a settlement in the Municipality of Trbovlje, Slovenia, known as Sveti Marko until 1955

See also 
 Saint Mark (disambiguation)